The Lower Glomma Region ("Nedre Glomma-regionen") is a statistical metropolitan region in Østfold in southeastern Norway. It is centered on the cities of Fredrikstad and Sarpsborg near the Swedish border. It is located at the end of the Glomma River. 

1/ km²2/ Population per km²

See also
Metropolitan Regions of Norway

Metropolitan regions of Norway